The rodent parvorder or infraorder Phiomorpha comprises several living and extinct families found wholly or largely in Africa. Along with Anomaluromorpha and perhaps the extinct Zegdoumyidae, it represents one of the few early colonizations of Africa by rodents.

During the Oligocene, Africa was not connected to any of the other continents.   The predominant theory suggests that rodents first evolved in Laurasia, and expanded outward from there. Although Europe, Asia, and North America were distinct landmasses during much of the Eocene and Oligocene, they experienced intermittent migration events across the shallow sea separating Europe and Asia, via an ice-free Greenland (Europe and North America), or across Beringia (North America and Asia). The southern continents were much more isolated leading to the unique faunas of Australia, South America, and to a lesser degree Africa.

Although the hystricognath rodents may have evolved from an early entodacryan ancestor in Asia, they migrated to Africa soon after. Phiomorpha represents the clade that evolved as a result.  Although once diverse, this infraorder is now restricted to the Old World porcupines, the cane rats, the dassie rat, the naked mole-rat, and the blesmols.

Families 
The makeup of this infraorder is controversial. At its core lie the extant families Thryonomyidae, Petromuridae, and Bathyergidae and their extinct relatives. The Old World porcupines (Hystricidae) are sometimes included in Phiomorpha, but many authorities consider them either basal to all hystricognaths or basal to all hystricognaths except the Laotian rock rat (family Diatomyidae); also, more recent evidence not supports them belonging in Phiomorpha. Molecular results suggest that the Diatomyidae is a part of the Ctenodactylomorphi, but this is in contrast to morphological results which place the animal at a basal position to all hystricognaths.

Infraorder Phiomorpha
Family †Diamantomyidae
Family Hystricidae - Old World porcupines
Family †Kenyamyidae
Family †Myophiomyidae
Family Petromuridae - the dassie rat
Family †Phiomyidae
Family Thryonomyidae - cane rats and their extinct relatives
Parvorder Bathyergomorpha
†Paracryptomys - incertae sedis
Family Bathyergidae - blesmols
Family †Bathyergoididae
Family Heterocephalidae - naked mole-rats

See also 
Caviomorpha
Hystricomorpha
Hystricognathi

References 

Huchon, D. E. J. P. Douzery. 2001. From the Old World to the New World: A molecular chronicle of the phylogeny and biogeography of hystricognath rodents. Molecular Phylogenetics and Evolution, 20:238-251.
Marivaux, L. M. Vianey-Liaud, and J.-J. Jaeger. 2004. High-level phylogeny of early Tertiary rodents: dental evidence. Zoological Journal of the Linnean Society, 142:105-134.
McKenna, Malcolm C., and Bell, Susan K. 1997. Classification of Mammals Above the Species Level. Columbia University Press, New York, 631 pp. 

Rodent taxonomy
Hystricognath rodents
Extant Oligocene first appearances
Taxa named by René Lavocat